The 8th (Lucknow) Division was a formation of the British Indian Army's Northern Army that was first formed as a result of the Kitchener reforms of the Indian Army in 1903. The Division remained in India on internal security duties during World War I, though the 8th (Lucknow) Cavalry Brigade was transferred to the 1st Indian Cavalry Division and served in France on the Western Front, and the 22nd Lucknow Infantry Brigade served as part of the 11th Indian Division in Egypt.

Division formation in 1914

8th (Lucknow) Cavalry Brigade
Commander: Major General Cookson
1st King's Dragoon Guards
16th Cavalry
36th Jacob's Horse
39th Central India Horse

22nd (Lucknow) Brigade
Commander: Major General A. Wilson
3rd Battalion, Royal Fusiliers
1st Battalion, King's Own Scottish Borderers
17th Infantry (The Loyal Regiment)
36th Sikhs
74th Punjabis
U Battery, Royal Horse Artillery
V Brigade, Royal Field Artillery
63rd, 64th and 73rd Batteries

Fyzabad Brigade
Commander: Brigadier General Kavangh
12th Cavalry
1st Battalion, Leinster Regiment
9th Bhopal Infantry

Allahabad Brigade
Commander: Brigadier General Cowper
17th Cavalry
1st Battalion, Royal Scots
3rd Battalion, Middlesex Regiment
62nd Punjabis
92nd Punjabis

Presidency Brigade
Presidency Brigade was based in Calcutta.
Commander: Major General May
2nd Battalion, Royal Fusiliers
2nd Battalion, King's Own Royal Regiment (Lancaster)
1st Battalion, Argyll and Sutherland Highlanders
11th Rajputs
22nd Punjabis
93rd Burma Infantry
2/10th Gurkha Rifles
XVII Brigade RFA
10th, 26th and 92nd Batteries
51st and 62nd Companies RGA

Unbrigaded
5th Light Infantry – at Nowgong
113th Infantry – at Dibrugarh
123rd Outram's Rifles – at Manipur
1/8th Gurkha Rifles – at Shillong

See also

 List of Indian divisions in World War I

References

Bibliography

External links

Indian World War I divisions
Military units and formations established in 1903
Military units and formations disestablished in 1922
British Indian Army divisions